Michael Holper (born May 21, 1981) is a former Filipino-American professional basketball player. Born in Norfolk, Virginia, he last played for the San Miguel Beermen. He plays the power forward and center positions. Holper is known to be a defensive player.

Career
Holper had the most number of starts among rookies in the 2005–06 season with 35 and this showed the kind of trust by then Barangay Ginebra Kings coach Siot Tanquingcen gave to him. Holper was a reliable player especially in defense and rebounding. But because of nagging injuries, he was sidelined for most of the 2005–06 season with the Kings.

Holper was later released by the Kings to clear salary cap. He was then signed by the Barako Bull Energy Boosters. In 2009, he was signed by the San Miguel Beermen. After his stint with the Beermen, he decided to retire from professional basketball.

Life after basketball
After playing basketball professionally, Holper decided to return to the United States where he has now become a doctor.

Personal life
Holper is married to his wife, whom he has three children.

He has a younger brother, named Melvin, who also plays power forward, who played college basketball in the Philippines for the Southwestern University of the Cebu Schools Athletic Foundation, Inc.

References

External links
 Barangay Ginebra Kings

1981 births
Living people
American men's basketball players
American sportspeople of Filipino descent
Barako Bull Energy Boosters players
Barangay Ginebra San Miguel players
Centers (basketball)
Filipino men's basketball players
Citizens of the Philippines through descent
Power forwards (basketball)
San Miguel Beermen players
Basketball players from Norfolk, Virginia
Barangay Ginebra San Miguel draft picks
San Diego State Aztecs men's basketball players